
Year 675 (DCLXXV) was a common year starting on Monday (link will display the full calendar) of the Julian calendar. The denomination 675 for this year has been used since the early medieval period, when the Anno Domini calendar era became the prevalent method in Europe for naming years.

Events 
 By place 

 Europe 
 King Childeric II is murdered by a band of dissatisfied Neustrians, along with his wife Bilichild and 5-year-old son Dagobert, while hunting in the forest of Livry (present-day Lognes) near Chelles.
 Theuderic III retakes the throne of his elder brother Childeric II. He inherits the Frankish kingdoms of Neustria and Burgundy. 
 Clovis III, an illegitimate son of Chlothar III, is proclaimed king of Austrasia by the Austrasian nobles.

 Britain 
 King Wulfhere of Mercia dies after a 17-year reign, in which he has extended his sway over much of England south of the Humber River, including Essex, Surrey, and part of Wessex north of the Thames. Wulfhere is succeeded by his brother Æthelred.
 April 1 – King Hlothhere of Kent re-establishes Kentish supremacy in London.

 Asia 
 The 25-year-old Wang Bo (王勃) writes Tengwang Ge Xu, to celebrate the Tengwang Pavilion (approximate date).
 January 5 – In Japan, a platform to observe the stars for astrologers is erected for the first time.
 March 14 – Princess Tōchi and Princess Abe of Japan proceed to Ise Jingū.
 March 16 – Emperor Tenmu decrees the end of serfdom. He also orders an end to granting lands to Princes of the Blood, to Princes and to Ministers and Temples.
 May 8 – Tenmu issues a decree to distribute the tax-rice for peasants in poverty, as well as a decree regulating fishing and hunting, and ordering a halt to eating the flesh of cattle, horses, dogs, monkeys and barn-yard fowl.
 Some Japanese ministers who oppose Tenmu are banished to an isolated island. A man climbs the hill east of the Palace, curses the emperor and kills himself.
 September 16 – A typhoon strikes Japan.

 By topic 

 Religion 
 The abbeys of Abingdon and Bath, England are founded (approximate date).
 Aldhelm is made abbot of Malmesbury Abbey.

Births 
 Boniface, Anglo-Saxon missionary (approximate date)
 Huoching, Alamannic nobleman (approximate date)
 Niu Xianke, chancellor of the Tang dynasty (d. 742)
 Tervel, ruler (khagan) of the Bulgarian Empire (d. 721)
 Wigbert, Anglo-Saxon monk (approximate date)

Deaths 
 February 18 – Colmán, bishop of Lindisfarne
 February 21 – Randoald of Grandval, prior of the Benedictine monastery of Grandval
 May 25 – Li Hong, prince of the Tang Dynasty (b. 652)
 Amandus, bishop and saint
 Bilichild, Frankish queen
 Childeric II, king of the Franks
 Germanus of Granfelden, Frankish abbot 
 Lupus I, duke of Aquitaine (approximate date)
 Máel Dub, Irish monk (approximate date)
 Wulfhere, king of Mercia

References

Sources